Socialist society may refer to one of the following.

A society based on socialism, inclusive collaborative decision-making 
The societies of the Communist states
Socialist Society, a periodical
Socialist society (Labour Party)